Sheldonia puzeyi is a species of land snail in the family Urocyclidae. This species is endemic to South Africa, where it occurs in a small strip of coastal habitat.

References

Urocyclidae
Endemic fauna of South Africa
Gastropods described in 1939
Taxonomy articles created by Polbot